Sexology